Hydrovatus subtilis, is a species of predaceous diving beetle found in India, Andaman & Nicobar Islands, Sri Lanka, Indonesia, Japan, Laos, Malaysia, and Thailand.

Body larger with a typical length of about 2.4 to 2.8 mm. Male antenna with joints 7 to 8 broader than adjacent joints. Head between eyes is not margined. Male with stridulation apparatus on metacoxal plates along suture close to metathorax.

References 

Dytiscidae
Insects of Sri Lanka
Insects described in 1882